D. G. Government Arts College for Women is an arts college located in the town of Mayiladuthurai in Tamil Nadu, India. It is affiliated to the Bharathidasan University.

References 
 

Arts colleges in India
Women's universities and colleges in Tamil Nadu
Education in Mayiladuthurai district